George Glover Crocker (1843–1913) was a Massachusetts lawyer and politician who served in the Massachusetts House of Representatives, and as a member, and President of, the Massachusetts Senate.

Early life
Crocker was born in Boston, Massachusetts on December 15, 1843 to Uriel and Sarah Kidder (Haskell) Crocker.

He died at his summer home in Cohasset on May 26, 1913 aged 69 source 1 .

Legal career
Crocker was admitted to the Massachusetts bar at Suffolk County on July 3, 1867.

See also
 102nd Massachusetts General Court (1881)
 104th Massachusetts General Court (1883)

References

1843 births
Politicians from Boston
Boston Latin School alumni
Harvard Law School alumni
Republican Party members of the Massachusetts House of Representatives
Republican Party Massachusetts state senators
Presidents of the Massachusetts Senate
1913 deaths